J2, J.II or J-2 may refer to:

Codes and classifications 
 J2, the IATA airline designator for Azerbaijan Airlines 
 J-2 visa, a nonimmigrant visa issued by the United States for spouses and dependents of J-1 visa exchange visitors
 ATC code J02, a subgroup of the Anatomical Therapeutic Chemical Classification System
 Haplogroup J2 (Y-DNA), a Y-DNA haplogroup
 Janko group J2 in mathematics
 Jinja2, a Python template engine that uses file extension .j2 
 , a celestial body's second dynamic form factor in the nodal precession
 , the second invariant of the deviatoric stress tensor

People and organizations 
 Jathushan Kandasamy, Nickname of the person
 j2 Global Communications, a tech company best known for electronic fax services
 J2 (music channel), a former New Zealand music TV Channel
 TVB J2, a digital TV channel of Television Broadcasts Limited
 J. League Division 2, the second-tier of Japanese professional association football
 Jefatura de Inteligencia del Estado Mayor Conjunto de las Fuerzas Armadas (J-2), an Argentine intelligence agency
 J2, the Intelligence Directorate of the United States Joint Chiefs of Staff
 Director of Military Intelligence, the head of Irish Defence Forces intelligence, sometimes referred to as J2

Vehicles 
 J-2, a rocket engine used in the Saturn rockets and intended for use on the Space Launch System
 AEG J.II, a World War I German ground attack aircraft
 Albatros J.II, a World War I German single-engine, single-seat, biplane ground-attack aircraft
 Allard J2, any of several postwar American market-designed English cars
 Auster J-2 Arrow, a 1945 British single-engined two-seat high-wing touring monoplane
 HMAS J2, an Australian submarine
 JAC J2, a city car produced by JAC Motors
 Junkers J 2, a 1916 all-metal German fighter prototype aircraft
 LB&SCR J2 class, a British LB&SCR locomotive
 McCulloch J-2, a 1962 small, two-seat autogyro
 MG J-type, a 2-seat sports car produced by the MG Car company from 1932 to 1934
 Taylor J-2, a 1935 American two-seat light aircraft
 Mikoyan-Gurevich MiG-15, an aircraft called J-2 in China

Other uses 
 J2, a comicbook character, son of Juggernaut
 J2, a killer whale also known as Granny
 J2 League, Japanese football league
 County Route J2 (California)
 J2, a duo music project consisting of brothers Johnny and Justin Coppolino
 S/2003 J 2, a retrograde irregular satellite of Jupiter
 Hell Cat, a roller coaster formerly named J2 at Clementon Amusement Park
 J2, Jared Padalecki and Jensen Ackles, stars of the TV series Supernatural
 Johnson solid J2, the equilateral pentagonal pyramid
 Rocketdyne J-2, a cryogenic rocket engine used on the second and third stages of the Saturn V moon rocket
 Samsung Galaxy J2, an Android smartphone
 Samsung Galaxy J2 Prime, a successor smartphone, also known as the Samsung Galaxy J2 Ace
 J2, an open-source clone of the Hitachi/Renesas SuperH-2 microcontroller
 J2 coefficient, representing the oblateness of Earth

See also 
 JII (disambiguation)